Brush Hill, also known as Old Scull House, is a historic mansion located at Irwin, Westmoreland County, Pennsylvania. It was built in 1798, and is a two-story, Federal style dwelling.  It is constructed of fieldstone.

It was added to the National Register of Historic Places in 1975.

References

Houses on the National Register of Historic Places in Pennsylvania
Federal architecture in Pennsylvania
Houses completed in 1798
Houses in Westmoreland County, Pennsylvania
National Register of Historic Places in Westmoreland County, Pennsylvania
1798 establishments in Pennsylvania